The FIVB Volleyball Women's U23 World Championship was the world championship of volleyball for female players under the age of 23 organized by Fédération Internationale de Volleyball (FIVB).

The first edition was staged in 2013 in Mexicali and Tijuana, Mexico and tournaments were played every two years until 2017. The last tournament was hosted by Turkey in Ankara and won by Brazil. FIVB did not announce the 2019 edition of the U23 tournament, later declaring that "As per decision of May 2019 FIVB Board of Administration, the U23 WCH has been abolished."

A corresponding tournament for male players was the FIVB Volleyball Men's U23 World Championship.

Results summary

Medals summary

Appearances

Legend
 – Champions
 – Runners-up
 – Third place
 – Fourth place
 – Did not enter / Did not qualify
 – Hosts

MVP by edition
2013 – 
2015 – 
2017 –

See also

 FIVB Volleyball Men's U23 World Championship
 FIVB Volleyball Women's World Championship
 FIVB Volleyball Women's U20 World Championship
 FIVB Volleyball Girls' U18 World Championship

References

External links

 
International women's volleyball competitions
Volleyball
Youth volleyball
Biennial sporting events
Recurring sporting events established in 2013
Recurring sporting events disestablished in 2019